Relations of Kurdistan Region of Iraq with foreign states and organizations are conducted by the Kurdistan Region. Political stability and a rapidly developing economy have given the KRG the opportunity to pursue a foreign policy independent from the central government's. The KRG's primary body for directing its foreign affairs is the Department of Foreign Relations (DFR). The DFR's foremost objectives are to raise the global profile of the Kurdistan Region, improve the Region's international ties with various governments and international organizations, and present emerging business opportunities in the Kurdistan Region to regional and international actors.

The KRG's foreign policy vision has paved the way for the establishment of various diplomatic representations in Kurdistan. A total of 30 countries have a diplomatic presence in Erbil. Multinational bodies, including the EU, UN, ICRC, JIA and the KOICA also have offices in Kurdistan. The KRG's presence abroad has grown significantly since 2007. Currently the KRG has representative offices in 14 countries.

Department of Foreign Relations
Kurdistan Region established the Department of Foreign Relations (DFR) in September 2006 to conduct relations with the international community. Today, the DFR is an integral part of the government, with a wide-ranging portfolio of responsibilities. DFR used to be headed by Foreign Minister Falah Mustafa Bakir from 2006. It has been headed by Minister Safeen Dizayee since 2019. The KRG Department of Foreign Relations is mandated to promote the interests of the Kurdistan Region and its people in regard to relations with the international community and in accordance with the Region's legislation and the Constitution of Iraq.

The key responsibilities of the department include:
 Strengthening bilateral relations with the international community
 Promoting trade, investment, tourism and institutional ties
 Supervising the KRG's offices overseas
 Liaising with the diplomatic community in the Kurdistan Region
 Organising the visits of political and economic delegations to the Kurdistan Region
 Coordinating and organising KRG relations with the Iraqi Ministry of Foreign Affairs and Iraqi embassies abroad
 Conducting and supporting activities that enhance the image of the Kurdistan Region
 Communicating between official KRG institutions and the international community
 Providing legal and authentication services to the people of the region and its citizens abroad

Bilateral relations

Europe

Armenia
Relations are described as 'cordial' and an Armenian consulate in Erbil is to be opened soon.

Australia

Canada

India
There has been limited diplomatic relations between India and Kurdistan Region despite the historical ties. India purchases Kurdish crude oil sold through Turkish companies. Several Indian citizens work in Kurdistan. Many Kurds travel to India for educational or medical purposes. In July 2014, Hemin Hawrani, head of the Kurdistan Democratic Party's international relations wing, told The Hindu that he hoped for deeper political and economic ties with India, describing the country as "an important partner". Hawrani also expressed his desire to see the Indian government open a consulate in Erbil, and invited Indian companies to invest in Kurdistan. In November 2014, the Indian government sent special envoy Ambassador Suresh K. Reddy to visit Kurdistan and meet Kurdish government officials. Reddy stated that India "fully supports the Kurdistan Region during this difficult time", and expressed confidence in the Kurdish government and the Peshmerga forces to preserve the stability and security of the region. The Ambassador also praised the role of Peshmerga forces in fighting ISIL, and announced that the Indian government would open a consulate in Kurdistan.

Israel

In 2004 was reported about the meetings of Israeli officials with Kurdish political leaders when Massoud Barzani, Jalal Talabani and the former Israeli Prime Minister Ariel Sharon publicly confirmed the good relations of Israel and Kurdistan Region. The President of the Iraqi Kurdistan, Massoud Barzani answered a question while visiting Kuwait in May 2006 about the Kurdish–Israeli relationship:
"It is not a crime to have relations with Israel. If Baghdad established diplomatic relations with Israel, we could open a consulate in Erbil." In a policy address in 2014, Israeli Prime minister Benjamin Netanyahu supported the establishment of an independent Kurdish state. He said: "The Kurds are a fighting people that have proven political commitment and political moderation, and they're also worthy of their own political independence."

Jordan

South Korea 
Kurdistan and South Korea share strong diplomatic and economic relations as well as military support from the Korean Armed Forces. The Zaytun Division (Korean: 자이툰 부대; Kurdish: Tîpa Zeytûnê) was a Republic of Korea Army contingent operating in Kurdistan from September 2004 to December 2008. An additional 2,200 troops (mostly engineers) were deployed to Erbil in the Kurdistan Region of Northern Iraq by early September 2004 and were grouped with the humanitarian troops who were relocated from Southern Iraq. The combined unit consisted of 2,800 soldiers. Another 800 soldiers were dispatched to reinforce the existing troops in Erbil in November 2004, thus increasing the size of South Korea's contingent to 3,600.

The Republic of Korea has a Consulate in Erbil that opened in 2004, the current Head General is Mr. Park Young-Kyu.

Kuwait

Palestine

Syria

Turkey

Consulate General of Turkey in Erbil was established in March 2010. Flourishing trade between the two, an influx of Turkish investment, and energy agreements have paved the way for increasing geopolitical cooperation, and helped overcome decades of tension. This expanding partnership, built upon mutual economic interests, was symbolized by the visit of Turkish Prime Minister Tayyip Erdogan to the Kurdistan Region in March 2011, the first such visit by a Turkish leader. Increasing trade volumes between Turkey and Kurdistan ($8.4 billion in 2012) empirically demonstrate the importance of this developing relationship. Past tensions have been supplanted by a new energy partnership and Turkey seems far less worried about the prospect of an independent Kurdistan Region. In May 2012, Turkey and the Kurdistan Regional Government cut a deal to build one gas and two oil pipelines directly from Kurdish-controlled northern Iraq to Turkey without the approval of Baghdad, taking the rapprochement started between the two in 2009 one step further.

Post independence referendum 
2017 Kurdistan Region independence referendum was heavily criticized and condemned by Turkish authorities and the independence vote significantly impaired the Turkey-Kurdistan Region relationship in the following years, though relations on the economical font remained significant. The border between KRG and Turkey remained open nonetheless, unlike Iran which also condemned the referendum and closed its border crossings in order to blockade the region. Turkey removed three television channels based in northern Iraq, including Kurdish news agency Rudaw, from its TurkSat satellite over broadcasting violations during the Kurdish Regional Government's referendum in September 2017. Turkey resumed flights to and from the Kurdistan Region in March 2018, which had been suspended since September 2017.

On 22 June 2019, the recently inaugurated President of the KRG Nechirvan Barzani visited Istanbul and met with Turkish President Tayyip Erdoğan, who described Barzani as his "special guest". It was Barzani's first official foreign visit as the President of the KRI. The goal of the visit was interpreted by several media outlets, including Voice of America, as attempting to gain Kurdish support for the ruling Justice and Development Party's candidate Binali Yıldırım in the 23 June 2019 Istanbul mayoral election.

United States
Currently the United States has official policy towards the Kurdistan Regional Government of Iraq. US Kurdish policy starting initially with "contacts" to a covert "relationship" and finally to an overt "institutionalized relationship" embodied in an official US Kurdish policy. The change of US interaction with the Kurds from humanitarian assistance to strategic partnership as a non-state ally and an asset is testimony to the enhanced role of the Kurdistan Region in the international relations of the Middle East. Deepening KRG–US economic relations was supported by establishment of the United States Kurdistan Business Council (USKBC) in April 2012. In the same month President of Kurdistan Region, President Masud Barzani, visited Washington, D.C. and met with President Barack Obama and Vice President Joe Biden.

The Consulate General of the United States in Erbil was established in July 2011. Kurdistan Region have a representative office in the United States from February 2007.

Relations with international organisations
Kurdistan Region holds 'member' or 'observer' status in only one international organisation.

Participation in international sports federations
Kurdistan Region holds 'member' status in two international sports federations.

See also
 List of diplomatic missions in Kurdistan Region
 List of diplomatic missions of Kurdistan Region
 Foreign relations of Iraq

References

External links
 KRG Department of Foreign Relations